Bae Seul-ki (born September 27, 1986) is a South Korean singer and actress. She made her entertainment debut as a member of The Red, but has since become a solo singer.

Career

Debut
Bae Seul-ki studied Theater and Film at Sangmyong University, then made her entertainment debut in the fall of 2005 as part of the project group The 빨강 (The Red) with actresses Oh Seung-eun and Ju So-young, which allowed her to gain stage experience and fame before her solo debut. Appearing on many variety shows, she became an Internet sensation when she showed her 복고 (bokko meaning "old school") dance on SBS's Love Letter.

2006
After the group split in early 2006 (as it was a "project group," used for introducing new singers), the record company felt that Bae could handle being a solo singer. They quickly prepared a digital single, with a full album following in the fall of 2006.  The first single from the album, "강한 여자" (Ganghan Yujah, meaning "Strong Woman"), had Carlos from the Korean rap group Uptown and featured Bae with many B-boys in a heavily choreographed breakdancing routine.  However, this single was quickly abandoned after a few weeks in favor of "말괄량이" (Malgwalyangee, meaning "Tomboy" or "Sassy Girl"), a song with a cute, light feel.  It was more in line with popular taste, as similar songs like "Cutie Honey" by Ahyoomee (from Sugar) and "Love Me Love Me" from Lee Ji-hye (formerly of S#arp) were doing well.  This song managed to perform well on the Korean music charts, and the music video also became number one for three weeks. In addition to promoting her single, she has also assisted Eru's performances of his second album comeback single, "까만 안경" (Ggaman Angkyung, "Black Glasses").

With the success of "Tomboy," her record company quickly released her second digital single in December 2006. Her title single "One by One" featured her in a snowy backdrop to suit the Christmas mood. The lyrics of this song were also written by her. After promoting this single on the various music programs, Bae sang a duet with Glass Box on a charity album called Mind Bridge.

2007
In May 2007, Bae made a guest appearance in the music video for Banana Girls' "Chocolate" alongside other stars such as Kan Mi-youn.

Returning with a new image after the success of "Strong Woman" and "Tomboy," Bae released her second album on October 8, 2007, titled Flying. Because of the popularity of her first album, she has come back with an entirely new image and worked with Korea's famous music producers to make this album.

The title track, "Seul-ki Say" was based on a vocal dance track. This is a departure from her previous sweet and cute image and was written to show off her singing skills. The music video for "What Is Love Like" was partly filmed in Beijing, China due to her large fanbase there.

On October 12, she performed her title track for the first time on KBS's Music Bank Comeback Special. With a more mature and sophisticated image, her performance slanted towards the "rock" side and surprised many of her fans. Soon after, her Comeback Special became number one on the search engine and this marked the start of her promotional activities.

Hosting and acting
She appeared in the variety shows Love Letter in 2005, and Catch Light in 2006. After ending the promotion of her album, Bae has moved on to hosting. In April 2007, she began hosting a music programme on KM TV called POP, which introduced popular foreign music to Korean fans. She also hosted MBC's Music Show with Brian Joo from Fly to the Sky, acting as a guest MC in place of Kim Hyun-joong from SS501.

She was cast as the lead actress in the hip-hop drama Groove Party (also known as Hot Dance World), a China-Korea collaboration. When she arrived on Shanghai in mid-May 2007 for filming, more than 300 fans arrived at the airport to welcome her, and at the same time showering her with many gifts. Unfortunately, the project did not push through. After training for her role as an assassin in the international film Finale, she was later pulled out due to funding issues.

She then acted in the stage musicals Lunatic (2008) and On Air Live (2010).

In 2011, she had supporting roles in the MBC dramas The Greatest Love and Midnight Hospital, as well as the film Couples.

Endorsements
As of August 2007, Bae has become the spokesperson for Korea's Eyainteractive Company's MMORPG (Online Game) Luna Online. The reason she was chosen was because of her similarity to the character's liveliness and cuteness.

In 2014, Bae featured as a main dancer in the MV of the popular Chinese song, "Little Apple".

Personal life
Bae has two younger siblings, a brother and a sister. She is a practicing Roman Catholic.

She married YouTuber Shim Seop in 2020.

Discography

Studio albums

Extended plays

Singles

Soundtrack appearances 

Source:

Filmography

Television
2003: Thousand Years of Love (SBS)
2004: Full House (KBS2) (cameo, episode 1)
2004: Emperor of the Sea (KBS2)
2005: Rainbow Romance (MBC)
2005 to 2006: Banjun Drama (SBS)
"Unforgettable Love" (with DBSK)
"Suicide Rescue Team"
"A Very Special Story"
"The Third Guy"
"Taxi 1986"
"Junjin Goes to School"
2005: Love Letter (SBS)
2006: Catch Light (KM)
2006: Break
2009: Superstar Black City
2011: The Greatest Love (MBC)
2011: Midnight Hospital (MBC)
2012: Man of the Equator (KBS2)
2013: Unemployed Romance (E Channel)
2015: The Flatterer (YouTube)
2016: Still loving you
2017: The Idolmaster KR (Amazon Original Series, SBS)
2018: Risky Romance (MBC) 
2021: Amor Fati (SBS)

Film
2011: Couples
2012: Weird Business (segment: "The Suicidal Assassin")
2013: Short! Short! Short! 2013 (segment: "The Body")
2013: Tough as Iron
2013: Door to the Night 
2014: A Case of Bachelor Abduction
2014: School of Youth: The Corruption of Morals

Musical theatre
2008: Lunatic
2010: On Air Live

References

External links
 

1986 births
Living people
K-pop singers
South Korean women pop singers
South Korean film actresses
South Korean female idols
South Korean television actresses
21st-century South Korean singers
21st-century South Korean women singers
21st-century South Korean actresses